Place des Fêtes is a station of the Paris Métro, serving lines 7bis (towards Pré Saint-Gervais only) and 11 in the 19th arrondissement and the Belleville district. It is one of the deepest stations in the metro at 22.45 meters underground (Abbesses is the deepest at 36 meters).

History 
The station opened on 18 January 1911 as part of a branch of line 7 from Louis Blanc to Pré Saint-Gervais. The line 11 platforms opened with the first section of the line from Châtelet to Porte des Lilas on 28 April 1935. Along with Maison Blanche, a prototype air raid shelter was added to the station in 1935 to protect it from chemical attacks and was fitted with airtight doors to allow the people to take refuge in the event of an attack. They were chosen due to their proximity to heavily populated, working-class districts. On 3 December 1967, this branch was separated from line 7, becoming line 7bis. 

In preparation for line 11's extension to Rosny–Bois Perrier, its platforms were raised slightly and tiled infrom 4 August to 7 September 2018. In March 2019, a new emergency exit was completed, located in a small building in Square Monseigneur Maillet, near access 1. It was designed to blend in with its natural surroundings with a wooden design and a green roof. It was a former access to the station and was closed to the public.

In 2019, the station was used by 2 921 564 passengers, making it the 181st busiest of the Métro network out of 302 stations.

In 2020, the station was used by 2,107,812 passengers amidst the COVID-19 pandemic, making it the 115th busiest of the Métro network out of 305 stations.

In 2021, the station was used by 3,258,568 passengers, making it the 94th busiest of the Métro network out of 305 stations.

Passenger services

Access 
The station original access building with a canopy built in a Art Nouveau style was demolished in 1935 to make way for its current Art Deco building. It now has two accesses:

 Access 1: Place des Fêtes
 Access 2: rue de Crimée

Station layout

Platforms 

Line 7bis's island platform is located in a curve and is flanked by two tracks. The southern track, on the outer side of the curve, is used for regular service for services towards Pré Saint-Gervais. The northern track, on the inner side of the curve, is not used for regular service. It leads to a connection with line 3bis towards Porte des Lilas - Cinéma via Voie des Fêtes and Haxo (a ghost station). It is decorated in the Andreu-Motte style utilising orange tiles.

Line 11's platforms have a standard configuration with 2 tracks surrounded by 2 side platforms.

Other connections 
The station is also served by lines 20, 48, and 60 of the RATP bus network.

Nearby 

 Regard de la Lanterne
 Square Monseigneur Maillet

Gallery

References

Roland, Gérard (2003). Stations de métro. D’Abbesses à Wagram. Éditions Bonneton.

Paris Métro stations in the 19th arrondissement of Paris
Railway stations in France opened in 1911
Articles containing video clips
Art Deco architecture in France

Paris Métro line 7bis
Paris Métro line 11